This is a list of the longest-running television shows by category. The criterion for being the longest-running show is by the number of years the show has been on the air and not the number of episodes produced.

The Brazilian show Programa Silvio Santos is the longest-running television show of all time hosted by the same person.

See also
 List of longest-running American television series
 List of longest-running British television programmes
 List of longest-running Australian television series
 List of longest-running Philippine television series
 List of longest-running American cable television series
 List of longest-running American primetime television series
 List of longest-running American first-run syndicated television series
 List of television series canceled after one episode
 List of television programs by episode count

References

Longest-running
Entertainment-related lists of superlatives
Category